Finalista is the first concert DVD of the punk rock band Pidzama Porno. This album was released at 26 November 2007. The material was recorded in three places: Wroclaw, Kraków and Warsaw. This DVD includes many interviews with the band and technicians.

Track list
  Czas, Czas, Czas
  
  Bulgarskie Centrum Hujozy
  
  Outsider
  
  Katarzyna Ma Katar
  
  News form Tienanmen
  Gorzka
  Pryszcze
  Ulice Jak Stygmaty
  
  Styropian
  Droga Na Brzesc
Bonus:
16.  
17.

The band
Krzysztof "Grabaż" Grabowski – vocal
Andrzej "Kozak" Kozakiewicz – guitar, vocal
Sławek "Dziadek" Mizerkiewicz – guitar
Rafał "Kuzyn" Piotrowiak – drums
Julian "Julo" Piotrowiak – bass guitar

Guests:
Gutek (Indios Bravos)
Tomasz Klaptocz (Akurat)

External links
http://www.pidzamaporno.art.pl/?p=new_view&id=225#comment

Pidżama Porno albums
2007 video albums
Live video albums
2007 live albums